The 1958 United States Senate election in Nevada was held on November 4, 1958. Incumbent Republican U.S. Senator George W. Malone ran for re-election to a third term, but was defeated by Democrat Howard Cannon.

Republican primary

Candidates
George W. Malone, incumbent U.S. Senator

Results
Senator Malone was unopposed for re-nomination by the Republican Party.

Democratic primary

Candidates
Fred Anderson, surgeon from Reno and member of the University of Nevada Board of Regents
Howard Cannon, City Attorney of Las Vegas

General election

Campaign
This campaign was considered one of the most competitive and highly watched in the nation in 1958. Senator Malone was known nationally as a leader within the Republican Party's right wing and held key appointments on the Senate Finance and Interior Committees.

Malone campaigned on his experience and seniority in the Senate, using the slogan "He Knows Nevada Best." He received support from Eisenhower cabinet secretaries Fred Seaton and Ezra Taft Benson. Benson, one of the Twelve Apostles of the Church of Jesus Christ of Latter-Day Saints, was especially influential among Nevada's large Mormon population. His endorsement was seen as particularly important in light of Cannon's Mormon faith. Late in the campaign, Malone published full-page ads touting his effort to save Nevada from a federal gambling tax.

Cannon focused his attacks on Malone's absentee record in the Senate and his reputation on Capitol Hill as an unpopular extremist.

Results
Cannon easily won the election owing to his overwhelming support in his native Clark County, which contained 47 percent of the state's registered voters. He was the first candidate from southern Nevada elected to the United States Senate.

References

See also 
 1958 United States Senate elections

Nevada
1958
1958 Nevada elections